İlisu is a village and municipality in the Qakh District of Azerbaijan.  It has a population of 1,370. It was the capital of the Elisu Sultanate. The postal code is AZ 3417.

Reserve 

Ilisu State Nature Reserve was established on February 20, 1987, by decree number 57, with an area of 9345 ha. It is located on the south side of the Greater Caucasus (Gakh), between Zagatala and Ismayilli Reserve, at an altitude of 700–2100 metres. The area was expanded by the decree of the Cabinet of Ministers of the Azerbaijan Republic dated March 31. Now its area is 17381.6 ha.

Gallery

References 

Populated places in Qakh District
Ilisu